Cardinal Carter Catholic High School, often shortened to Cardinal Carter, is an International Baccalaureate high school in Aurora, Ontario, Canada in the York Catholic District School Board.

Cardinal Carter was established in 1989, commencing operation for grades eight and nine at Our Lady of the Annunciation elementary school. Once construction of the school was completed, service boundaries were defined by the school board to alleviate overcrowding of other Roman Catholic schools in the region, notably St. Robert and St. Elizabeth high schools in Thornhill, and Sacred Heart Catholic High School in Newmarket. It takes its name after Cardinal Gerald Emmett Carter, former archbishop of Toronto. It is also sometimes confused with Cardinal Carter Academy for the Arts.

Notable alumni
Alex Formenton, professional hockey player
Dakota Goyo, actor
James Tuck, Canadian football player

References

External links
 Cardinal Carter Catholic High School website
  School Council website

York Catholic District School Board
High schools in the Regional Municipality of York
Catholic secondary schools in Ontario
Education in Aurora, Ontario
Educational institutions established in 1989
1989 establishments in Ontario
International Baccalaureate schools in Ontario